Yevgeny Alekseyev may refer to:
Evgeny Alekseev (basketball) (1919–2005), Russian basketball player and coach
Evgeny Alekseev (chess player) (born 1985), Russian chess player
Evgenii Alexeev (1946–1987), Russian botanist
Yevgeni Ivanovich Alekseyev (1843–1917), Russian military leader and politician
Yevgeni Viktorovich Alekseyev (born 1982), Russian footballer
Yevgeniy Alexeyev (canoeist) (born 1977), Kazakhstani sprint canoeist